The Thomas Jefferson Building is the oldest of the four United States Library of Congress buildings. Built between 1890 and 1897, it was originally known as the Library of Congress Building. It is now named for Thomas Jefferson, a Founding Father and the third U.S. president whose own book collection became part of the library in 1815. The building is located on First Street, S.E. between Independence Avenue and East Capitol Street in Washington, D.C. across from the U.S. Capitol. 

The Beaux-Arts style building is known for its classicizing facade and elaborately decorated interior. The building's main architect was Paul J. Pelz, initially in partnership with John L. Smithmeyer, and succeeded by Edward Pearce Casey during the last few years of construction. The building was designated a National Historic Landmark in 1965.

Design

John L. Smithmeyer and Paul J. Pelz won the competition for the architectural plans of the library in 1873. The start of the project was delayed by congressional debates until a vote in 1886. In 1888, Smithmeyer was dismissed and Pelz became the lead architect. Pelz was himself dismissed in 1892 and replaced by Edward Pearce Casey, the son of Brig. Gen. Thomas Lincoln Casey, Chief of the U.S. Army Corps of Engineers, who at the time was in charge of the building's construction. While Smithmeyer was instrumental in securing the commission, Pelz appears to have been the main designer of the building and oversaw most of the exterior work. Bernard Green, the superintendent of construction, and Casey are credited for the completion of the interiors and the artistic supervision of the building's unique decorative program. The Library opened to the public in 1897 and the finishing work was completed in 1898.

The Thomas Jefferson Building, containing some of the richest public interiors in the United States, is a compendium of the work of classically trained American sculptors and painters of the "American Renaissance", in programs of symbolic content that exhibited the progress of civilization, personified in Great Men and culminating in the American official culture of the Gilded Age; the programs were in many cases set out by the Librarian of Congress, Ainsworth Rand Spofford. The central block is broadly comparable to the Palais Garnier in Paris, a similarly ambitious expression of triumphant cultural nationalism in the Beaux-Arts style that had triumphed at the World's Columbian Exposition in Chicago, 1893. On the exterior, sculptured portrait heads that were considered typical of the world's races were installed as keystones on the main storey's window arches. The second-floor portico of the front entrance facing the U.S. Capitol features nine prominent busts of Great Men as selected by Ainsworth Rand Spofford in accordance with Gilded Age ideals. From left to right when one faces the building, they are Demosthenes (portico north side), Ralph Waldo Emerson, Washington Irving, Johann Wolfgang von Goethe, Benjamin Franklin, Thomas Babbington Macaulay, Nathaniel Hawthorne, Sir Walter Scott and Dante Alighieri (portico south side). The sculptors were Herbert Adams, Jonathan Scott Hartley and Frederick W. Ruckstull. The Court of Neptune Fountain centered on the entrance front invites comparison with the Trevi Fountain; its sculptor was Roland Hinton Perry. The copper dome, originally gilded, was criticized at the structure's completion, as too competitive with the national Capitol Building. Originally, the dome over the Main Reading Room was intended to be less than 70 ft tall to avoid this critique, however Casey and Green increased the size of the dome to 195 ft and covered it with 23 carat gold leaf.

History

Needing more room for its increasing collection, the Library of Congress under Librarian Ainsworth Rand Spofford suggested to the Congress that a new building be built specifically to serve as the American national library. Prior to this the Library existed in a wing of the Capitol Building. The new building was needed partly because of the growing Congress, but also partly because of the Copyright Law of 1870, which required all copyright applicants to send to the Library two copies of their work. This resulted in a flood of books, pamphlets, maps, music, prints and photographs. Spofford had been instrumental in the enactment of this law.

After Congress approved construction of the building in 1886, it took eleven years to complete. The building opened to the public on November 1, 1897, met with wide approval and was immediately seen as a national monument. The building name was changed on June 13, 1980, to honor former U.S. President Thomas Jefferson, who had been a key figure in the establishment of the Library in 1800. Jefferson offered to sell his personal book collection to Congress in September 1814, one month after the British had burned the Capitol in the War of 1812.

Book Conveying Apparatus 
Prior to the 2000s, the Jefferson Building was linked to the Capitol Building by a purpose built book tunnel. This housed an electric "book conveying apparatus" that could transport volumes between the two buildings at 600 feet per minute. A portion of the book tunnel was destroyed to make room for the underground Capitol Visitor Center, which opened in 2008.

Capitol Page School

Senate, House and Supreme Court pages formerly attended school together in the Capitol Page School located on the attic level above the Great Hall. Upon the separation of the programs (and the closure of the Supreme Court Page Program), the schools split. Senate Pages now attend school in the basement of their dormitory. The House Page Program was closed in August 2011. A small suite in the northwest corner of the attic level remains home to the official office of the Poet Laureate of the United States.

Coolidge Auditorium
The Elizabeth Sprague Coolidge Auditorium, which opened in October 1925, has been home to more than 2,000 concerts, primarily of classical chamber music, but occasionally also of jazz, folk music, and special presentations. Some performances make use of the Library's extensive collection of musical instruments and manuscripts. Most of the performances are free and open to the public.

Elizabeth Sprague Coolidge was a wealthy patron of the arts and was no relation to Calvin Coolidge, who, coincidentally, was President of the United States at the time the Coolidge auditorium was established.

Art
According to the Records of the Columbia Historical Society, Bernard Green, who played an important role on the interior design of the building, viewed the interior art as necessary “to fully and consistency carry out the monumental design and purpose of the building”.

Art and sculptures can be found in and throughout the Jefferson Building. Representatives of the National Sculpture Society met with Casey and Green during the building's construction to select the sculptors for the Library's statues and figures. In 1894, 20 American sculptors were extended commissions and 19 accepted. In total, more than fifty American painters and sculptors produced commissioned works of art.

The Main Reading Room, circular in shape, is surrounded by eight giant marble columns that are each decoratively topped with a large statue of a female figure. The 8 statues each represent different aspects of knowledge and are symbols of civilization, including: Religion, Commerce, History, Art, Philosophy, Poetry, Law, and Science. Pendentives rest above each symbolic statue, with a quote from a notable author/work relating to each aspect.

Additionally, there are 16 bronze statues on raised balustrades overlooking the floor of the Main Reading Room. These statues "pay homage to men whose lives symbolized the thought and activity represented by the plaster statues.".  The subjects were chosen by Ainsworth Rand Spofford, Librarian of Congress from 1864 to 1897.

Details of each of the symbolic and portrait statues are included in the table below.

See also
Paul J. Pelz
John Adams Building
James Madison Memorial Building
National Audio-Visual Conservation Center
List of National Historic Landmarks in Washington, D.C.
Architecture of Washington, D.C.

References

Sources

 Architect of the Capitol, Washington, D.C. "Thomas Jefferson Building Architecture." Accessed 2011-12-18.
 Library of Congress. "Thomas Jefferson Building: A Brief History of the Library." Accessed 2011-12-18.

External links

1897 establishments in Washington, D.C.
Government buildings completed in 1897
Library buildings completed in 1897
Buildings of the United States government in Washington, D.C.
Library of Congress
Beaux-Arts architecture in Washington, D.C.
National Historic Landmarks in Washington, D.C.
Capitol Hill
Southeast (Washington, D.C.)
Building